Swimming was among the sports contested at the 2022 Commonwealth Games, held in Birmingham, England. The sport had been staged in all twenty-one previous editions of the Games thus far, and will be contested in England for the third time.

The competition took place between 29 July and 3 August 2022, spread across fifty-two events (including twelve parasport events). For the first time, visually impaired swimming was held at the Commonwealth Games.

Schedule
The competition schedule was as follows:

Venue
The swimming competitions were held at the Sandwell Aquatics Centre, the only new-build permanent venue constructed for the Games. The diving competition also took place there.

Qualification (parasport)

A total of up to 96 para swimmers (48 per gender) qualified to compete at the Games. Nations may earn three quotas per event, allocated as follows:
 Athletes in the World Para Swimming (WPS) World Rankings (for performances between 31 December 2020 and 18 April 2022).
 Recipients of a CGF/WPS Bipartite Invitation.

Medal summary

Medal table

Medalists

Men

Parasport

Women

Parasport

Mixed

 Swimmers who participated in the heats only and received medals.

Participating nations
There were 57 participating Commonwealth Games Associations (CGA's) in swimming with a total of 449 (246 men and 203 women) athletes. The number of athletes a nation entered is in parentheses beside the name of the country. This marked Dominica's sport debut in the sport at the Commonwealth Games.

References

External links
 Official website: 2022 Commonwealth Games – Aquatics - Swimming and Para Swimming

 
2022 Commonwealth Games events
Commonwealth Games
2022
Swimming competitions in the United Kingdom